Loíza Lake, or Lago Loíza, is a reservoir located in the municipality of Trujillo Alto, Puerto Rico. It was formed by construction of the Carraízo Dam on the Río Grande de Loíza. It serves as the main water supply source of the San Juan metropolitan area.

Gallery

References

Reservoirs in Puerto Rico
Trujillo Alto, Puerto Rico